The Dartmouth is a historic apartment building in Indianapolis, Indiana. It was built in 1890 and is a large six-story, nine-bay-by-twelve-bay building faced in two shades of center-scored, salt-glazed brown brick. It features two three-sided projecting bays, limestone accents, and a crenelated parapet.

It was listed on the National Register of Historic Places in 1983.

References

Apartment buildings in Indiana
Residential buildings on the National Register of Historic Places in Indiana
Residential buildings completed in 1930
Residential buildings in Indianapolis
National Register of Historic Places in Indianapolis